Charlotte Mäder (born 18 July 1905, date of death unknown) was a German track and field athlete. She competed at the 1928 Summer Olympics in the discus throw and placed ninth. Between 1926 and 1930 Mäder was ranked among world's best 10 discus throwers; she was also a leading German javelin thrower and shot putter.

References

1905 births
Year of death missing
People from Bernau bei Berlin
People from the Province of Brandenburg
German female discus throwers
Olympic athletes of Germany
Athletes (track and field) at the 1928 Summer Olympics
Sportspeople from Brandenburg
20th-century German women